Jeremie Agyekum Frimpong (born 10 December 2000) is a Dutch professional footballer who plays as a right-back for Bundesliga club Bayer Leverkusen and the Netherlands national team.

Club career

Manchester City 
Frimpong joined Manchester City at the age of nine and progressed through the club's youth ranks, with regular appearances in Premier League 2 and the UEFA Youth League.

Celtic 
On 2 September 2019, Frimpong signed a four-year deal with Celtic. Later that month, he made his professional debut against Partick Thistle in the Scottish League Cup quarter-finals. He made an immediate impact, winning the man of the match award on his debut, and going to become a regular in the first team. His speed and skill was highlighted by the media, and made him popular with Celtic fans. On 27 October, Frimpong scored in a 4–0 win against Aberdeen, his first professional goal. He won his first career honour on 8 December 2019, when Celtic defeated Rangers 1–0 in the Scottish League Cup Final. He was described by Celtic manager Neil Lennon as "outstanding" and "arguably our best [outfield] player in the first half", although he was sent off early in the second half for a foul on Alfredo Morelos in the penalty box. In June 2020, Frimpong was voted Celtic's Young Player of the Year for season 2019-20 by the club's supporters.

Bayer Leverkusen 
On 27 January 2021, Frimpong signed for German side Bayer Leverkusen for an undisclosed fee, on a four and a half year deal.

International career
Born in the Netherlands, Frimpong is of Ghanaian descent on his mother's side. His family moved to England when he was seven years old. As such, he is eligible to play for the Netherlands, Ghana and England.

Frimpong has represented the Netherlands at under-19 youth international level, and made his international debut against Armenia U19 in November 2018. In November 2019, he made his under-20 debut.

In November 2022, Frimpong was included in the final selection of the Netherlands National Football Team for the 2022 FIFA World Cup. Even though, according to an article on the NOS website, he does not speak a lot of Dutch, although he understands match talks and football language. He did not appear in the tournament as the Netherlands were knocked out by Argentina in the quarter-finals.

Career statistics

Honours
Celtic
 Scottish Premiership: 2019–20
Scottish Cup: 2019–20
 Scottish League Cup: 2019–20
Individual

 kicker Bundesliga Team of the Season: 2021–22

References

2000 births
Living people
Footballers from Amsterdam
Dutch footballers
Netherlands youth international footballers
Dutch sportspeople of Ghanaian descent
Association football fullbacks
Manchester City F.C. players
Celtic F.C. players
Bayer 04 Leverkusen players
Dutch expatriate footballers
Scottish Professional Football League players
Bundesliga players
2022 FIFA World Cup players
Expatriate footballers in Scotland
Expatriate footballers in England
Expatriate footballers in Germany
Dutch expatriate sportspeople in Scotland
Dutch expatriate sportspeople in England
Dutch expatriate sportspeople in Germany